The Jean Bonnet Tavern, also known as Old Forks Inn and Bonnet's Tavern, is an historic inn and restaurant located just outside Bedford, Pennsylvania on U.S. Highway 30, at the junction with Pennsylvania Route 31. It can be seen from the Pennsylvania Turnpike.

The British first recognized the lands as being owned by Robert Callender, a trader with the Native American tribes of Pennsylvania. The land was first documented when the original 690 acre parcel was transferred from the William Penn family to a land speculator named Hans Ireland. It was again transferred to Callender in 1762 and in 1763, the large stone structure was built.

The location of the stone structure was intended to be a safe haven for settlers passing through the area as well as the site of a French fort and trading post. The tavern was referenced in the personal journals of many travelers that passed through the area on the way to what they called "Old Shawnese Cabins" which is Shawnee State Park (Pennsylvania) today. 

The land and the building were purchased by Jean (John) Bonnet in 1779 and opened as an inn and tavern, which was used as a gathering place by protesting local farmers during the 1794 Whiskey Rebellion. Protesting the federal tax on whisky, local Pennsylvanian farmers gathered to raise a Liberty pole at the tavern as a symbol of their defiance. The protests were suppressed months later by forces under President George Washington.

Although the building has changed hands many times through the years, mostly maintained as a tavern and inn although in some owners converted into a private residence, the Bonnett Family of West Virginia are the direct descendants of Jean Bonnet and trace their family history back nearly 400 years. In 1957 the Jean Bonnet was purchased by the Enyeart family. During their ownership, the stores of paranormal events in the building began being publicized. Local folklore of guests and employees of the Inn reference seeing a lone figure roaming the building and drinking at the tavern bar. Said to be the ghost of Bonnet and is a popular topic of discussion and adds to the allure of the inn. 

It is a 2 1/2 to 3 1/2-story, building measuring 40 feet by 51 feet and constructed of native cut fieldstone. The walls are over two feet thick. The four interior levels have nearly 8,000 square feet. It features two levels of porches that extend the entire length of the front and the rear elevations. Inside the building has large exposed chestnut beams with massive stove fireplaces  It is operates today as a bed and breakfast tavern and gift shop. A small garden and goat pen outside of the tavern is also a popular spot for guests to visit before of after their meal. 

It was listed on the National Register of Historic Places in 1979.

See also
 My Ghost Story, a television series featuring the Jean Bonnet Tavern on April 30, 2011

References

External links

 
 
 http://explorepahistory.com/hmarker.php?markerId=1-A-29B

Hotel buildings completed in 1762
Restaurants in Pennsylvania
Taverns in Pennsylvania
Bed and breakfasts in Pennsylvania
Hotel buildings on the National Register of Historic Places in Pennsylvania
Historic American Buildings Survey in Pennsylvania
Buildings and structures in Bedford County, Pennsylvania
Cuisine of the Mid-Atlantic states
National Register of Historic Places in Bedford County, Pennsylvania
Whiskey Rebellion